Lepturonota tristis is a species of beetle in the family Cerambycidae. It was described by Xavier Montrouzier in 1861, originally under the genus Leptonota.

Varieties
 Lepturonota tristis var. aenea (Montrouzier, 1861)
 Lepturonota tristis var. albovittata Fauvel, 1862
 Lepturonota tristis var. chalybaea Lepesme & Breuning, 1953
 Lepturonota tristis var. ruficollis (Fauvel, 1906)

References

Enicodini
Beetles described in 1861